"The Fix" is the twenty-first episode of the seventh season of the American medical drama House.  It aired on May 9, 2011.

Plot
After losing a bet on a boxing match to Wilson, House sets out to prove the fighter he bet on (Kevin Phillips) lost due to an underlying medical condition. House also begins injecting himself with an experimental drug reported to regrow muscle in rats. The team treats a scientist, Dr. Lee (Linda Park) for seizures and symptoms of radiation poisoning. They discover that Dr. Lee's boyfriend, Ceaser, has been poisoning her with Spanish Fly, which causes symptoms similar to radiation poisoning.

Cast
Besides the main cast the episode also features Ken Olandt, John T. Woods, Drew Cohn, Frank Drank, Denice Sealy, Helena Apothaker and Bobbin Bergstrom.

Songs 
"Unseen Eye" by Sonny Boy Williamson I

Reception

Critical response  
IGN gave the episode the score of 7.5 over 10, praising the plot of House's new medicine.

The A.V. Club gave this episode a C rating.

References

External links 
 "The Fix" at Fox.com
 

2011 American television episodes
House (season 7) episodes